Tetragonoderus insignicollis is a species of beetle in the family Carabidae. It was described by Maximilien Chaudoir in 1878.

References

insignicollis
Beetles described in 1878